McDowell County is a county in the U.S. state of West Virginia. As of the 2020 census, the population was 19,111. Its county seat is Welch. McDowell County is the southernmost county in the state. It was created in 1858 by the Virginia General Assembly and named for Virginia Governor James McDowell. It became a part of West Virginia in 1863, when several Union-affiliated counties seceded from the state of Virginia during the American Civil War. McDowell County is located in the Cumberland Mountains, part of the Appalachia region.

Due mostly to a decline in employment in the coal mining industry, McDowell County's population has decreased from almost 100,000 in 1950 to less than 20,000 in 2020. The people of McDowell County suffer high rates of drug abuse and poverty, and have a life expectancy well below the national average.

History
On February 20, 1858, McDowell County was formed from the northern portion of Tazewell County.  In 1861, as the nation lurched toward civil war, delegates from McDowell County voted in favor of Virginia's secession from the United States.  The northwestern counties of the region were Union-affiliated and voted to secede from Virginia the following year, but McDowell, Greenbrier, Logan, Mercer, Monroe, Pocahontas, Webster, and Wyoming counties in the southern section all refused to participate.  The status of these eight counties would be decided by the United States Supreme Court in the case of Virginia v. West Virginia.

McDowell was one of fifty former Virginia counties that were recognized as the state of West Virginia on June 20, 1863.  The same year, the residents of McDowell County chose Perryville, now English, then the most populous town, as their new county seat. However, in 1866 the state legislature relocated the county seat to a farm near the mouth of Mill Creek. There it remained until 1874, when it returned to Perryville. The location of the county seat remained in dispute until 1892, when it moved to Welch.

In 1863, West Virginia's counties were divided into civil townships, with the intention of encouraging local government.  This proved impractical in the largely rural state, where population density was low. In 1872 the townships were converted into magisterial districts. McDowell County was divided into three districts: Big Creek, Elkhorn, and Sandy River.  In the 1890s, Browns Creek District was formed from a portion of Elkhorn, and North Fork District was created from parts of Browns Creek and Elkhorn.  A sixth district, Adkin, was created from part of Elkhorn District in the early 1900s.  These districts remained stable until the 1980s, when Adkin, Elkhorn, and North Fork were consolidated into the district of North Elkin.

Referring to the unconventional demographics and political state of McDowell County, a local newspaper editor described the county as "the Free State of McDowell", a description that has stuck in the popular imagination. The origin of this moniker is unknown. Tom Whittico, the founder and first editor of The McDowell Times–the first African-American paper in West Virginia–, said he used it because African Americans had greater electoral power, civil freedoms, and freedom from segregation in McDowell County than in other locations in the state.

McDowell county had the first World War One Memorial to honor black soldiers.

By the first half of the 20th century, McDowell County's economy was dominated by coal mining. In 1950, it was the "leading coal producing county" in the United States. Sixteen percent of the county's population in 1950 was employed in the coal mining sector. However, in the next few decades major breakthroughs in mechanization in the coal industry resulted in job declines. By 1960 the mining workforce had decreased from around 16,000 to around 7,000. Many people left because of the lack of jobs, but people with longstanding family ties were reluctant to do so.

While running for president, John F. Kennedy visited McDowell County and promised to send help if elected. His first executive order created the Food Stamps program and the first recipients of food stamps were in McDowell County. In May 1963, the increasing rate of poverty in McDowell County led President Kennedy to remark in a speech given in the city of Welch:
I don't think any American can be satisfied to find in McDowell County, in West Virginia, 20 or 25 percent of the people of that county out of work, not for 6 weeks or 12 weeks, but for a year, 2, 3, or 4 years.

Geography

It is bordered by Tazewell County, Virginia, to the south; Buchanan County, Virginia, to the west; Mingo County to the northwest; Wyoming County to the north; and Mercer County to the east. The county is located in the Cumberland Mountains a sub-region of the Appalachian Mountains.

The county is roughly in the shape of a semi circle, with the border following the mountains around the county.

Demographics
The county hit its peak of population in 1950 with almost 99,000 people, but job losses in the next decades caused sharp declines in population.

2010 census
As of the 2010 United States census, there were 22,113 people, 9,176 households, and 6,196 families residing in the county. The racial makeup of the county was 89.1% white, 9.5% black or African American, 0.2% American Indian, 0.1% Asian, 0.0% from other races, and 1.1% from two or more races. Those of Hispanic or Latino origin made up 0.4% of the population. The largest ancestry groups were: 13.7% Irish, 12.0% German, 11.5% English, 8.0% American, 2.8% Sub-Saharan African, 2.7% Italian, 2.0% Dutch, 1.1% Scotch-Irish 

Of the 9,176 households, 28.7% had children under the age of 18 living with them, 48.1% were married couples living together, 13.9% had a female householder with no husband present, 32.5% were non-families, and 28.8% of all households were made up of individuals. The average household size was 2.36 and the average family size was 2.86. The median age was 43.8 years.

The median income for a household in the county was $22,154 and the median income for a family was $28,413. Males had a median income of $31,229 versus $26,776 for females. The per capita income for the county was $12,955. About 27.5% of families and 32.6% of the population were below the poverty line, including 44.3% of those under age 18 and 20.1% of those age 65 or over.

Life expectancy
Of 3,142 counties in the United States in 2013, McDowell County ranked last in the life expectancy of both male and female residents. Males in McDowell County lived an average of 63.5 years and females lived an average of 71.5 years, compared to the national average for life expectancy of 76.5 for males and 81.2 for females. Moreover, the average life expectancy in McDowell County declined by 3.2 years for males and  4.1 years for females between 1985 and 2013, compared to a national average for the same period of an increased life span of 5.5 years for men and 3.1 years for women. High rates of smoking and obesity and a low level of physical activity appear to be contributing factors to the declining life expectancy for both sexes.

In 2020, the Robert Wood Johnson Foundation ranked McDowell County as 55th of 55 counties in West Virginia in "health outcomes," as measured by length and quality of life.

Drug-induced deaths
In 2015, McDowell County had the highest rate of drug-induced deaths of any county in the United States, with 141 deaths per 100,000 people. The rate for the United States as a whole was 14.7 per 100,000 people. Neighboring Wyoming County had the second highest rate.

Economy

The county has been classified as a "food desert" by the USDA. In 2017, there were only two full-sized grocery stores to serve the county's 535 square miles. The county's only Walmart Supercenter, the county's largest employer, closed in 2016.

Financial services remain scant in the area. In 1999, The First National Bank of Keystone, the only bank located in the coal town of Keystone and the town's major employer at the time, was closed by the FDIC due to fraud. Management had been falsifying the bank's financial statements by booking income from loans the bank did not own, giving the appearance that the bank was generating large profits when it was in fact insolvent. At the height of the scandal, executives buried large volumes of documents in a trench in an attempt to conceal the fraud from the bank's accounting firm and from the Office of the Comptroller of the Currency.

Poverty 
In 2020 McDowell was the third-poorest county in the U.S. (out of 3,143 counties), with a median annual household income of $26,072. The percentage of the population living in poverty was estimated at 31.8 percent. This compares with a median annual household income of $67,521 and a poverty rate of 11.4 percent in the U.S. as a whole.

Politics
The power of industrial and mining political systems turned the county towards the Republican Party between 1890 and 1932, even supporting William Howard Taft during the divided 1912 presidential election. However, starting in 1936, the county realigned towards the Democratic Party, given its strong unionization in the coal mining sector, voting for the Democratic candidate in every election from 1936 to 2008 except Richard Nixon's 1972 landslide. Since 2012, the county has trended Republican again, due to the Democratic Party's position on issues such as coal mining and guns. In 2020, Republican Donald Trump won the largest share of the vote ever for a Republican presidential nominee in the county, garnering 78.9% of the vote.

Government

Education
McDowell County Schools operates the county's public K-12 education system of 7 elementary schools, 2 middle schools, and 2 public high schools in McDowell County including Mount View High School, and River View High School. The county also has a private school, Twinbranch Pentecostal Christian Academy which is located in Twinbranch.

McDowell County Schools were under state control as a 'take-over' county from 2001 to 2013. Some medical services have been brought onsite into schools to reduce student absenteeism among families with only one car, and personal items such as sneakers and backpacks are now made available to students. A mixed use, multistory building in Welch aimed at reducing the housing shortage for teachers is scheduled to open in 2020.

In popular culture
Melville Davisson Post used McDowell County as the setting of his short story "Once In Jeopardy". This 1890s tale of the working out of a legal problem is rich in description of the people, customs, politics, and recent history of the area, including the impact of the railroad coming through and the rise of Republican influence.

Author and NASA engineer Homer Hickam grew up in Coalwood, McDowell County. His memoir October Sky, which was adapted into a Hollywood movie, is based on his childhood amateur rocket building experiences in Coalwood.

Transportation

Major highways
  U.S. Route 52
  West Virginia Route 16
  West Virginia Route 80
  West Virginia Route 83
  West Virginia Route 103
  West Virginia Route 161
  West Virginia Route 635

The West Virginia Division of Highways is currently trying to construct new highways, such as U.S. Route 121, known as the Coalfields Expressway.

Airport
The county also had one airport, Welch Municipal Airport, which is now closed indefinitely.

Communities

Cities
 Gary
 Keystone
 War
 Welch (county seat)

Towns
 Anawalt
 Bradshaw
 Davy
 Iaeger
 Kimball
 Northfork

Magisterial districts
 Big Creek
 Browns Creek
 North Elkin
 Sandy River

Census-designated places

 Bartley
 Berwind
 Big Sandy
 Crumpler
 Cucumber
 Maybeury
 Pageton
 Raysal
 Roderfield
 Vivian

Unincorporated communities

 Algoma
 Apple Grove
 Asco
 Ashland
 Atwell
 Avondale
 Beartown
 Big Four
 Bishop (partial)
 Black Wolf
 Bottom Creek
 Canebrake
 Capels
 Caretta
 Carlos
 Carswell
 Coalwood
 Eckman
 Elbert
 Elkhorn
 English
 Ennis
 Erin
 Faraday
 Filbert
 Gilliam
 Havaco
 Hemphill
 Hensley
 Hull
 Isaban (part)
 Jacobs Fork
 Jed
 Jenkinjones
 Johnnycake
 Jolo
 Kyle
 Landgraff
 Leckie
 Lex
 Lila
 Litwar
 Maitland
 Marine
 McDowell
 Mohawk
 Mohegan
 Monson
 Newhall
 Panther
 Paynesville
 Powhatan
 Premier
 Ream
 Rift
 Rockridge
 Rolfe
 Sandy Huff
 Six
 Skygusty
 Squire
 Superior
 Switchback
 Thorpe
 Twin Branch
 Union City
 Upland
 Vallscreek
 Venus
 Warriormine
 Wilcoe
 Worth
 Yerba
 Yukon

See also
 Anawalt Lake Wildlife Management Area
 Berwind Lake Wildlife Management Area
 Coal camps in McDowell County, West Virginia
 National Register of Historic Places listings in McDowell County, West Virginia
 McDowell County Schools
 Panther Wildlife Management Area
 Pocahontas coalfield
 Tyler Edward Hill

References

External links
 McDowell County, West Virginia
 McDowell County Board of Education
 McDowell County Commission
 McDowell County Economic Development Authority
 McDowell County Community Calendar
 McDowell County Economic Development Home Page
 McDowell County GenWeb Project
 McDowell Public Library

 
1858 establishments in Virginia
Populated places established in 1858
Counties of Appalachia